Porcupine River may refer to:

Porcupine River, in Alaska, United States and Yukon, Canada
Porcupine River (British Columbia), in British Columbia, Canada
Porcupine River (Ontario), in Ontario, Canada